KnowledgeWare was a software company headquartered in Atlanta, Georgia co-founded by James Martin and run by Fran Tarkenton.  It produced a Computer Aided Software Engineering (CASE) tool called IEW (Information Engineering Workbench) and a subsequent enhancement ADW (Application Development Workbench). These products contained 4 modules known as 'workstations': Planning, Analysis, Design, & Construction. KnowledgeWare was sold to Sterling Software in 1994, which was in its turn acquired by Computer Associates.

Tarkenton is credited with having coined, "A fool with a tool is a faster fool" while offering classes at their offices on Peachtree Street.

Tarkenton, Don Addington and other executives were eventually involved in legal actions brought by the SEC for engaging in a fraudulent scheme to inflate KnowledgeWare's financial results to meet sales and earnings projections.

References

Engineering companies of the United States
Defunct software companies of the United States
Companies based in Atlanta
Defunct companies based in Georgia (U.S. state)